Conversation Peace is the 22nd album released by American musician Stevie Wonder, on the Motown label in 1995. The album was Wonder's first full-length non-soundtrack studio album since 1987's Characters. This album yielded the hits "For Your Love" (a Grammy winner for Wonder for Best R&B Male Vocal Performance) and the reggae-flavored "Tomorrow Robins Will Sing". This album also saw Wonder reuniting with Robert Margouleff, who assisted during Wonder's "classic period" from 1972 to 1974.

Wonder wrote about 40 songs in 1993 after being invited to stay for six weeks in Ghana by President Jerry John Rawlings. A number of these songs were eventually shaped into album form. Motown announced in August 1993 that Conversation Peace would be released later that year; however, Wonder continued to work on the album through 1994 until its release in March 1995, when Vibe magazine reported that the album had been in development "off and on for at least the past four" years.
A circulating outtake from these sessions, "Ms and Mr Little Ones", was later released on Natural Wonder.

Reception

Critics felt that the album was a return to Wonder's classic period of the 1970s. John Milward in a 1995 review in Rolling Stone gave it four stars and felt that while the album is "reminiscent" of Wonder's classic albums, its "lean execution" gives it a "modern sound".  While the quality of the work was appreciated, Greg Kot of the Chicago Tribune and Jean Rosenbluth of the Los Angeles Times felt that the style was a bit too familiar and well-worn to be interesting, though Robert Christgau of The Village Voice gave it an "A−" and remarked that while listeners may have "heard all this before, that doesn't mean it's worn out its welcome." Stephen Thomas Erlewine gave it two-and-a-half stars in a retrospective review for Allmusic and felt the music wasn't contemporary enough to get radio play.

Track listing 
All songs written and composed by Stevie Wonder, except where noted.
 "Rain Your Love Down" – 6:08
 "Edge of Eternity" – 6:04
 "Taboo to Love" – 4:25
 "Take the Time Out" – 5:05
 "I'm New" – 5:41
 "My Love Is with You" – 5:54
 "Treat Myself" (Wonder, Stephanie Andrews) – 4:55
 "Tomorrow Robins Will Sing" (Wonder, Edley Shine) – 4:46
 "Sensuous Whisper" – 5:47
 "For Your Love" – 5:00
 "Cold Chill" – 6:53
 "Sorry" – 6:15
 "Conversation Peace" – 6:39

Personnel 
Personnel involved in the album include:
 Stevie Wonder – Guitar, arranger, keyboards, vocals, background vocals, multi-instruments, mixing
 Anita Baker – Background vocals
 Ollie Brown – Conductor
 Lenny Castro – Percussion
 Ernie Fields, Jr. – Tenor saxophone
 Nolan Shaheed - Trumpet
 Ray Brown - Trumpet
 Fernando Pullum - Trumpet
 Jorge Arciniega - Trumpet
 Fred Wesley - Trombone
 Reggie Young - Trombone
 Ladysmith Black Mambazo – Background vocals
 Robert Margouleff – Mixing
 Branford Marsalis – Saxophone
 Greg Phillinganes – Keyboards
 Melvin "Wah Wah" Ragin – Guitar
 Ben Bridges - Guitar solo on "Cold Chill"
 Nathan Watts – Bass, background vocals, associate producer
 Deniece Williams – Background vocals
 The Winans - Background vocals
 Syreeta Wright – Background vocals
 Take 6 - Background vocals
 The Artist Formerly Known As Prince - credited.

Charts

Weekly charts

Year-end charts

Certifications

References

External links
 Stevie Wonder interview by Pete Lewis, Blues & Soul, March 1995

Stevie Wonder albums
1995 albums
Motown albums
Albums produced by Stevie Wonder
New jack swing albums